Elevate Holdings is an American aviation, air transportation, aircraft management and maintenance service group. It was founded in 2003 by Greg Raiff.

Background
Elevate Holdings is a group of multiple aviation and aircraft management companies founded by Greg Raiff. Raiff started his first business, a student travel and tour service company, while still in college. He sold the company in 1999 and started a company in 2003 which later became Elevate Holdings. Raiff is currently the chief executive of Elevate Holdings.

Elevate Holdings has several subsidiaries, including Private Jet Services Group, Elevate Jet, Keystone Aviation (acquired in June 2022), and Keystone MRO. Elevate Holdings the 15th largest aircraft management business in the United States.

Services
Elevate Holdings offers aircraft management and maintenance services, on-demand charter, consultancy for owners and charter users, and brokerage services for buyers and sellers.

References

External links
Official website – Elevate Holdings
Private Jet
Keystone Aviation
Elevate Jet

Aviation in the United States